Wembley Park is a London Underground station in Wembley Park, north west London. The station is served by the Underground's Jubilee and Metropolitan lines and is in Travelcard Zone 4. It is located on Bridge Road (A4089) and is the nearest Underground station to the Wembley Stadium and Wembley Arena complex. This is where the Jubilee line from Stanmore diverges from the Metropolitan line which was formerly a branch of the Metropolitan Railway and was taken over by the Bakerloo line and today part of the Jubilee line.

History

Before the station 
Services to Harrow started on 2 August 1880, extending the MR route (today's Metropolitan line) into Middlesex. At this time Wembley was a sparsely populated rural area which did not merit the construction of a railway station and MR trains passed through without stopping. In his 1973 BBC documentary Metro-land, Sir John Betjeman remarked, "Beyond Neasden there was an unimportant hamlet where for years the Metropolitan didn't bother to stop. Wembley. Slushy fields and grass farms." However the then chairman of the MR, Edward Watkin, was an ambitious businessman who sought new ways of attracting paying passengers out of London and onto his railway, and he regarded the barren lands of Wembley as a business opportunity.

Opening of the station 
In 1881 Watkin purchased large tracts of land close to the MR line and began a grand scheme to build an amusement park at Wembley, laid out with boating lakes, a waterfall, ornamental gardens and cricket and football pitches. The centrepiece of this park was to be a soaring metal tower, known as Watkin's Tower; at  it was to be taller than the Eiffel Tower and would offer panoramic views of the surrounding countryside, just 12 minutes from Baker Street station. Wembley Park station was specially constructed to serve these pleasure grounds as a destination for excursion trips on the company's trains. The station opened for the first time on 14 October 1893 and initially operated to serve only Saturday football matches in the park. It opened fully on 12 May 1894.

Watkin confidently anticipated that large crowds would flock to the park and the railway station design incorporated additional platforms to handle large passenger numbers. Watkin's Tower ran into structural and financial difficulty; it was never completed and the partially built structure was demolished in 1904. Despite this, Wembley Park itself remained a popular attraction and flourished.

Later in the 1890s, the Great Central Railway's (GCR's) London extension was constructed adjacent to the MR's tracks. The tracks pass under the entrance building but the station has never been served by main line operators. In 1905 the tracks were electrified and the first electric trains became operational. Between 1913 and 1915, the MR added additional tracks to double the line's capacity.

From 1915 the MR began a programme of selling off its surplus land holdings in Buckinghamshire, Hertfordshire and Middlesex for suburban housing development. Its Metropolitan Railway Country Estates Limited marketed areas such as Wembley Park under the "Metro-land" brand, promoting modern homes in beautiful countryside with a fast railway service to central London. The MR sold the park land at Wembley when the site was selected to host the 1924 British Empire Exhibition and the grand British Empire Exhibition Stadium constructed for this event was later to become Wembley Stadium, the home ground of the England national football team.

Stanmore branch and Bakerloo line 
On 10 December 1932, the MR opened a branch line north from Wembley Park to Stanmore. Originally, the MR served all stations south from Wembley Park to Baker Street station but the line suffered from congestion due to limited capacity on the tracks heading into Baker Street. Following the combination of the MR and London's other underground railways to form the London Passenger Transport Board (LPTB) in 1933, the LPTB took steps to alleviate the congestion by constructing new Bakerloo line tunnels from Baker Street to connect to the Metropolitan's tracks south of Finchley Road station. From 20 November 1939, the Bakerloo line then took over the Metropolitan stopping services between Wembley Park and Finchley Road and the Stanmore branch.

1948 Olympic Games 
Following World War II, London was chosen to host the 1948 Olympic Games. To handle the exceptional number of spectators visiting Wembley Stadium, the original station building was extended, with a new ticket hall, additional circulation routes and platform stairs. This was built in a red-brick modernist style. At the opening of the Jubilee line on 1 May 1979, the Bakerloo service from Baker Street to Stanmore was transferred to the new line.

UEFA Euro 1996 

When the UEFA European Football Championship was held at Wembley in 1996, a large temporary staircase was constructed leading down from the 1948 extension and under the newly built Bobby Moore Bridge, which had opened in 1993. Intended as a temporary structure, the staircase remained in its unfinished state until 2004 when station upgrade works commenced.

Upgrade and expansion 
As part of the Wembley Stadium redevelopment in the early 2000s, the station was comprehensively rebuilt and expanded, increasing capacity by 70%. Costing £80m, the work included a significantly larger ticket hall, additional footbridges, widened stairs to Olympic Way and 5 lifts to provide step-free access. To cater for event crowds, event day entrances/exits were also constructed. Undertaken by Tube Lines, the expansion was completed in 2006, prior to the completion of the delayed Stadium project. The provision of additional platforms for Chiltern Railways services was considered, but was not proceeded with.

In the early 2020s, Transport for London proposed a new residential development on land adjacent to the station currently used as car parking. This development of over 450 new homes with Barratt Homes was approved by Brent Council in Dec 2020.

Layout
The station currently has six London Underground tracks, with the two Jubilee line tracks in the centre flanked in turn by the Slow and Fast (outermost) Metropolitan line tracks. There are fast and semi-fast trains during peak hours  (Southbound during the morning peak and Northbound during the evening peak). Fast and semi fast trains pass through this station in the southbound direction and can sometimes passes in the northbound direction. In practice, platform 6 isn’t used often as fast and semi-fast trains pass in the southbound direction. Both Metropolitan and Jubilee line trains may start or end their service at the station. Jubilee line trains that terminate at Wembley Park reverse via sidings between the running lines to the north of the station. Meanwhile, Metropolitan line trains that terminate at Wembley Park use the fly-under and Neasden depot to reverse.

Connections
London Buses routes 83, 182, 206, 223, 245 and 297 serve the station.

Future developments
There was a proposal in the early 2000s for a underground railway running between Brent Cross and Surbiton which would call at this station. This was superseded by the proposed West London Orbital overground route using existing tracks, not running via Wembley Park, which is still at the proposal stage and is not approved or funded at present.

The Fastbus is also a proposed limited-bus service running from Wembley Park to North Acton.

Gallery

References

External links

 
 
 
 
 
 
 

Jubilee line stations
London Underground Night Tube stations
Metropolitan line stations
Tube stations in the London Borough of Brent
Former Metropolitan Railway stations
Railway stations in Great Britain opened in 1893
Wembley